Barbara Collet (born 13 February 1974) is a French former professional tennis player.

Collet reached a career best ranking of 286 in the world and won three ITF singles titles. She featured as a wildcard in the main draw of the 1992 French Open and was beaten in the first round by Larisa Savchenko.

ITF finals

Singles: 5 (3–2)

Doubles: 3 (1–2)

References

External links
 
 

1974 births
Living people
French female tennis players